Forest Retreat is a historic home of Kentucky governor (during 1828–1832) and United States Senator Thomas Metcalfe, located in Nicholas County, Kentucky. It is currently operated as a Bed & Breakfast hotel and event venue.

It was built in 1795. The grounds of Forest Retreat include the Metcalfe family burial plot. Interred at this plot are Thomas Metcalfe (1780–1855) and various of his relatives, and 1954 Kentucky Derby-winning horse, Determine.  Thomas Metcalfe was a stonemason and later 10th Governor of Kentucky, and he contributed to the building of this house then later retired to here.

The farm deteriorated until 1933 when it was bought by Dr. Eslie Asbury.  Later his son used it as a working farm and he had a horse, Determine, win the 1954 Kentucky Derby.

It was listed on the National Register of Historic Places in 1973. The  listing included three contributing buildings in addition to the farmhouse.  

An earlier home of Thomas Metcalfe, the Thomas Metcalf House in Robertson County, is also listed on the National Register. It was built by Thomas in c.1810.

See also
List of buildings constructed by Thomas Metcalfe

References

External links
Forest Retreat, official hotel website

Houses on the National Register of Historic Places in Kentucky
Houses completed in 1795
Houses in Nicholas County, Kentucky
Thomas Metcalfe buildings
National Register of Historic Places in Nicholas County, Kentucky
Stone houses in Kentucky
1795 establishments in Kentucky
Bed and breakfasts in Kentucky